Lichas is a genus of lichid trilobites from Ordovician-Devonian-aged marine strata of Europe and Morocco.

References

Lichida
Ordovician trilobites of Europe
Ordovician trilobites of Africa
Paleozoic life of Quebec